Three distinct coal-fired power stations were built at Deptford on the south bank of the River Thames, the first of which is regarded as the first central high-voltage power station in the world.

History

Deptford East (Low Pressure)
One of the first premises in London to be supplied with electricity was the Grosvenor Gallery in Bond Street. It was the brainchild of the Earl of Crawford, who had been inspired in 1881 by the International Exposition of Electricity in Paris. A power plant was duly built at the Grosvenor Gallery. It was designed to supply just lighting for the gallery but it was soon extended to supply nearby shops and residences and a larger power plant was opened in 1884. With the prospect of expanding still further, the London Electric Supply Corporation was formed (LESCo). Principal shareholders were the Earl of Crawford, his friend Sir Coutts Lindsay and Sir Coutts’ brother, Lord Wantage.

There were environmental objections to large-scale power generation in Central London, so LESCo decided to move to a new site in Deptford and to use the Grosvenor Gallery site as a substation. A feature of the Grosvenor scheme was its use of alternating current (AC) in preference to direct current (DC). The use of AC allowed the voltage to be raised to 10 kV for transmission between Deptford and Grosvenor Gallery. High-voltage cables were laid alongside the London & Greenwich Railway line, but cable design at that time was rudimentary, having short lengths and many joints. This caused a voltage drop of some 10% from end to end. In order to supply at 10 kV at Grosvenor Gallery substation, the design voltage at Deptford had to be set at 11 kV, which is why national transmission voltages became standardised in multiples of eleven.

Sebastian de Ferranti was appointed to engineer the scheme, and the world's first central power station opened at Deptford in 1889. ‘Central’ means that it was remote from most of its consumers. To distinguish it from later adjacent developments, Ferranti's power station subsequently took the name Deptford East LP. It was pioneering not just because it was "central" but because of its unprecedented scale and high voltage. It was built on a 3-acre warehouse site called The Stowage which once belonged to the East India Company and was later used by the General Steam Navigation Company. There were initially two generators driven by two 1500 hp Hick, Hargreaves reciprocating steam engines, supplied by 24 boilers burning coal brought by collier from Newcastle. There were teething problems both at the power station and at the Grosvenor Gallery substation, resulting in lengthy shutdowns and loss of customers. Ferranti himself was sacked in 1891 and succeeded by G. W. Partridge as chief engineer. The plant was rebuilt with steam turbines and other improvements, and electricity supply eventually became reliable. Demand increased steadily with customers supplied through different systems as follows:
 Domestic and commercial customers at 83.33-cycle single-phase AC.
 Industrial and other customers with three-wire DC and a choice of two voltages.
 Trams, railways and other customers at 25-cycle single-phase AC.

In 1923 the AC plant comprised: 1 × 700 kW, 2 × 1,000 kW, 1 × 1,200 kW, 1 × 1,400 and 5 × 2,000 kW reciprocating engine driven generators; there were 2 × 3,500 kW, 2 × 7,500 and 1 × 15,000 kW turbo-alternators. The DC supply was generated by a single 200 kW reciprocating engine and generator. The total installed capacity was 52.5 MW. The boiler plant produced a total of 490,000 lb/hr (61.73 kg/s) of steam. In 1923 the station generated 53.007 GWh of electricity, some of this was used in the plant,  the total amount sold was 46.044 GWh. The revenue from sales of current was £362,133, this gave a surplus of revenue over expenses of £143,574.

When Britain eventually standardised to 50-cycle three-phase AC, Deptford East LP was downsized to just a few 25-cycle turbine-generators. To feed the 50-cycle National Grid from the LP station, a frequency converter was installed in Deptford West. This motor-generator was commonly known as The Freak. Deptford East LP closed in the late 1960s.

Deptford West
In 1925, ten electricity supply companies, LESCo among them, amalgamated to become the London Power Company. Deptford West was conceived by LESCo but was built by LPC and was engineered by Leonard Pearce. The turbine house basement was built in a former dry dock. Initially, the station had two turbine-generators, a bank of coal-fired boilers and a single large concrete chimney at the northern end. Four additional turbine-generations were added in the late 1930s together with three house sets, additional boilers and a second chimney. Staff claimed that the basement of No. 2 turbine-generator was haunted by the ghosts of those who had died on the gibbets alongside the dry dock. This may have been on the site one of the original dry docks founded by Henry VIII for the Royal Navy. Deptford West closed in 1972.

The electricity output from Deptford West power station was as follows.

Deptford West annual electricity output GWh.

Deptford East (High Pressure)
When the electricity industry was nationalised in 1948, power generation came under the auspices of the British Electricity Authority. Deptford East HP opened in 1953 with three 52.5 MW turbine-generators, a range of coal-fired boilers (2 × 225,000 lb/hr (28.3 kg/s) and 5 × 250,000 lb/hr (31.5 kg/s); delivering at 950 psi and 925 °F (496 °C)) and a single chimney. The original plan had been to demolish the LP station to make way for an extension of the HP station, doubling its size. This was never realised because the rapid rate of rise of electricity demand needed much larger power plants than could be accommodated at Deptford. The HP station closed in 1983 under the auspices of the CEGB.

The electricity output from Deptford East power station was as follows.

Deptford East annual electricity output GWh.

Deptford site as a whole
The Deptford site was targeted in both World Wars. In 1916, a Zeppelin dropped a 250 lb bomb, killing one man and putting the entire traction and industrial switchboard out of action, but lighting supplies were restored within 12 minutes, and traction supplies were restored within 24 hours. During World War II, 27 Deptford staff were killed by bombs. The most extensive damage was caused by a bomb on the West switch house. The site as a whole was redeveloped during the 1990s with luxury apartments and a slipway for dinghies. The coaling jetty in the Thames survives. Also surviving are some walls of the west boiler house, which have been incorporated into the apartment structure. A nearby park was developed from a derelict site and was named Ferranti Park as a tribute to one of the great industrial pioneers.

A summary of all the turbine-generator ratings in the mid-1960s:

This compares with 4,000 MW at Drax and 3,200 MW at Hinkley Point C. Although Deptford was small by modern standards, its contribution to the war effort and to the post-war recovery period was invaluable.

A summary of the boiler capacities and steam conditions.

Coal supply
Coal was brought by sea from North East England or South Wales. The LPC and its nationalised successors had its own fleet of coastal colliers for this service, such as the 2,268 GRT SS Francis Fladgate built in 1933 and 2,904 GRT SS Oliver Bury built in 1945.

References

Bibliography
Cochrane, Rob, Cradle of Power, the Story of Deptford Power Stations.

External links 

'Ferranti’s Deptford Power Station' - South Western Electricity History Society
Deptford East 1882 alternator

Coal-fired power stations in England
Ferranti
Former power stations in London
Buildings and structures in the Royal Borough of Greenwich
Demolished power stations in the United Kingdom
Power stations on the River Thames
Port of London
Deptford
1891 establishments in England
1983 disestablishments in England